Markus Zusevics (born April 25, 1989) is an American football offensive tackle who is currently a free agent. He played college football for Iowa from 2009 to 2011. He is of Latvian descent.

Early years
Zusevics graduated from Prospect High School in Illinois in 2007.

Professional career
While bench pressing for the NFL Scouting Combine on February 24, 2012, Zusevics tore a pectoral muscle and missed most of the Combine workouts.

New England Patriots
On May 10, 2012, he was signed as an undrafted free agent by the New England Patriots. On August 26, 2013, he was placed on the injured reserve list and will miss the rest of the 2013 season.

New York Jets
Zusevics was signed by the Jets on May 19, 2014 after trying out for the team during rookie minicamp. He was released on August 23, 2014.

References

External links
Iowa Hawkeyes bio

1989 births
Living people
American football offensive linemen
Iowa Hawkeyes football players
American people of Latvian descent
Place of birth missing (living people)
New England Patriots players
New York Jets players